Acequia is an unincorporated community located in Douglas County, Colorado, United States.

History
A post office was in operation at Acequia between 1874 and 1900. Acequia is a Spanish word meaning "canal" or "channel", so the name was likely in reference to the nearby High Line Canal.

Geography
Acequia is located at  (39.5235994,-105.0280398).

References

Unincorporated communities in Douglas County, Colorado
Unincorporated communities in Colorado